Ziad Rahbani (born 1956) is a Lebanese composer, pianist, playwright, and political commentator. He is the son of Fairouz, one of Lebanon and the Arab world's most famous singers, and Assi Rahbani, one of the founders of modern Arab music.

His compositions are well known throughout the Arab world. He became by far the most influential Lebanese artist during the civil war. Many of his musicals satirize Lebanese politics both during and after the Lebanese Civil War, and are often strongly critical of the traditional political establishment.

Personal life
Ziad Rahbani is the son of the Lebanese composer Assi Rahbani and Nouhad Haddad, the Lebanese female singer known as Fairuz. 

Rahbani was married to Dalal Karam, with whom he has a boy named "Assi" but he was later found out not to be his biological son. Their relationship later ended in divorce, prompting Karam to write a series of articles for the gossip magazine Ashabaka about their marriage. Rahbani composed a number of songs about their relationship, including "Marba el Dalal" and "Bisaraha".

On Friday April 3, 2009, the Lebanese press reported that Rahbani filed a lawsuit with the Lebanese courts, asking to disown his son, Assi Rahbani Jr., and stripping him of the Rahbani name on all official records, and voiding any legal obligation towards him as a father, after DNA tests proved that Assi Jr. is not his son. Rahbani has also had a well-publicized relationship with actress Carmen Lebbos, which lasted for 15 years before the couple agreed to separate. 

Rahbani has a long-standing relationship with Lebanese leftist movements, and is a self-declared communist. Furthermore, in an interview with the journalist Ghassan Bin-Jiddu, Rahbani stated that the bloodbath massacres in the Palestinian camp Tall a-Za’tar by extreme-rightist Christian militias in 1976 was the main reason that drove him to leave to West Beirut. Notwithstanding, he also expressed his support to the Lebanese resistance and its project in the face of "the Israeli occupation and its Zionist Apartheid regime". Coming from a Christian family, his politics and viewpoints have meant that he has been at odds with some of his right teenage surroundings. During the Lebanese civil war, Rahbani resided in the religiously mixed, West Beirut suburbs.

Career
Rahbani's first known artistic work was "Sadiqi Allah" (My Friend God), a collection of writings between the years 1967 and 1968 when he was in his teens. In 1973, at age 17, Rahbani composed his first music for Fairuz, his mother. Assi Rahbani, his father, was hospitalized and his mother Fairuz was to play the leading role in Al Mahatta by the Rahbani brothers. Mansour Rahbani, his uncle, who had written the lyrics of a song about Assi Rahbani's forced absence, gave Ziad Rahbani the task of composing its music. The song "Saalouni El Nass" (People Asked Me) gained Rahbani recognition in the music world.

Career
Rahbani appeared for the first time on stage in Al Mahatta where he played the role of the detective. He also appeared later on in the Rahbani Brothers' Mays el Rim in the role of one of the policemen. Rahbani's first step into theatre was with the Bkennaya Theater in Sahriyyeh. He followed that with highly politicized string of plays.

As an actor, besides appearing in his own plays, Rahbani starred in Randa Chahal Sabbagh's 2003 film The Kite.

Collaborations
Before, during and after the war, Rahbani released and co-released several albums like: Bi hal shakel, Abou Ali, Halleluja, Shareet Ghayr Houdoudi, Houdou Nesbi, Ana Mouch Kafer, Hakaya al Atfal, Bema Enno, Monodose (with singer Salma Mosfi) and Maaloumat Mush Akidi (with singer Latifa).

He has also written the music for singles performed by others such as "Rafi2i Sobhi El Gizz", "Kifak Inta", "Iza baddik" "Abban 3an Jidd".

He has done some orchestrations for songs like "Madih el Zoll el Ali", "Ahmad el Zaatar" and "Moussakafoun noun". Rahbani has also mixed several albums such as Al ra2i el 3aam and Moussakafoun noun.

He has held concerts like the Oriental Jazz Concert in the BUC Irwin Hall, the Las Salinas Concert, the Forum de Beirut Concert, the Picadilly Concert, and "Mniha Concert" in Mont La Salle Ain Saadeh, the latter with his cousin Ghassan Rahbani.

He also performs live occasionally in pubs like "Medusa", "Mon Général" and the "Téatro".

Discography

Studio Releases

Albums for Fairuz

Stage & Radio

Notes

References

External links

 A compilation of press articles and interviews with Ziad Rahbani, in arabic
 Criticism on Ziad Rahbani, Fairouz, and Assi Rahbani's Art
 FairuzFan - contains information of Ziad's works with Fairuz his mother

1956 births
Living people
Lebanese actors
Lebanese left-wing activists
20th-century Lebanese male singers
Lebanese songwriters
Lebanese composers
Lebanese jazz musicians
Male jazz musicians
21st-century Lebanese male singers